This is a list of members of the Western Australian Legislative Council between 22 May 2001 and 21 May 2005:

Notes

 North Metropolitan Liberal MLC Alan Cadby resigned to sit as an independent on 2 June 2004, after losing Liberal pre-selection to recontest his seat at the 2005 election.
 South West MLC Paddy Embry was elected as a One Nation member, but resigned from the party on 15 May 2003 and sat as an independent. He later co-founded the New Country Party, and represented them in the Council towards the end of his term.
 The two remaining One Nation members, John Fischer and Frank Hough, resigned from the party on 1 June 2004 and began serving as independents. Hough later co-founded the New Country Party with Paddy Embry, while Fischer chose to serve out his term as an independent.
 Mining and Pastoral Labor MLC Tom Stephens resigned his seat on 28 September 2004 to contest the federal Kalgoorlie at the 2004 election, after the existing candidate died suddenly. Kevin Leahy served as a temporary replacement for the remainder of Stephens' term. Though Stephens failed to win the Kalgoorlie contest, he was instead elected to the Legislative Assembly as the member for Central Kimberley-Pilbara on 26 February 2005.
 South Metropolitan Greens MLC Jim Scott resigned on 20 January 2005 to contest the Legislative Assembly seat of Fremantle at the February 2005 election. He was replaced by Lynn MacLaren for the last weeks of his term, and MacLaren contested the South Metropolitan seat in what had been Scott's place.

Members of Western Australian parliaments by term